The Woman at Midnight (Portuguese: La Mujer de medianoche) is a 1925 Brazilian mystery film drama directed by Carlo Campogalliani.

The film premiered in Rio de Janeiro on 7 September 1925.

Cast
Paulo Benedetti   
Carlo Campogalliani as Jorge Peirada 
Amália de Oliveira   
Polly de Viana   
Bastos Estefânio   
Augusto Gonçalves as  Mena 
Luiz Lizman   
Lia Lupini   
Letizia Quaranta   
Alberto Sereno   
Ivo Soares   
Luiza Valle

External links
 

1920s mystery drama films
1925 films
Brazilian black-and-white films
Brazilian mystery drama films
Brazilian silent films
Films directed by Carlo Campogalliani
1925 drama films
Silent mystery drama films